The 2017 Four Nations Tournament (Torneio Quatro Nações) in Portuguese, was the fourth edition of the Four Nations Tournament held in São Bernardo do Campo, Brazil between 27–29 October as a Men's friendly handball tournament organised by the Brazilian Handball Confederation.

Results

Round robin
All times are local (UTC−02:00).

Final standing

Awards
MVP:  João Pedro Silva
Top Scorer:  Diego Morandeira
Best Goalkeeper:  Leonel Maciel

References

External links
Tournament page on CBHb official web site

Four Nations Tournament (handball)
Four Nations Tournament
2017 in Brazilian sport
Four
Four Nations Tournament